Hethidae is a family of nematodes belonging to the order Rhabditida.

Genera:
 Tutunema Hunt, 1998

References

Nematodes